Husher (also Hisher, Hoosier) is a former unincorporated community located within the Village of Caledonia, in Racine County, Wisconsin, United States. It is generally known as the area extending in all directions between 1/2 mile to 1 mile from the intersection of Wisconsin Highway 38 and Nicholson Road. This intersection is 2 miles south of the Racine/Milwaukee County line.

History
Historical legend states this area was named after Hoosier Creek, which runs through the area. Hoosier was spelled phonetically, and "Husher" was born.

References

Neighborhoods in Wisconsin
Geography of Racine County, Wisconsin